Montfaucon is an affluent commune in the Doubs department in the region of Bourgogne-Franche-Comté, France.

Geography

Population

See also
 Communes of the Doubs department

References

External links

 Official website 
 Montfaucon on the intercommunal Web site of the department 

Communes of Doubs